Ceranemota amplifascia is a moth in the family Drepanidae. It was described by John Frederick Gates Clarke in 1938. It is found in North America, where it has been recorded from California.

References

Moths described in 1938
Thyatirinae